José Enrique "Sito" Seoane Vergara (born March 16, 1989) is an American soccer forward who currently plays for ÍBV.

Playing career
After playing at San Jacinto College for two years and with USL PDL side Austin Aztex, Seoane played a single season at Southern New Hampshire University. He then played in Iceland with ÍBV and Fylkir in 2015 and 2016, before signing with United Soccer League side Ottawa Fury on October 10, 2016.

On May 9, 2018, Seoane announced his departure from the Ottawa Fury on Twitter after making three appearances and scoring one goal in the 2018 season. Six days later, May 15, 2018, Seoane announced he had signed for Grindavík.

On December 19, 2018, Seoane signed with USL League One side Chattanooga Red Wolves ahead of their inaugural 2019 season.

References

External links 
 

1989 births
Living people
Association football forwards
American soccer players
Southern New Hampshire Penmen men's soccer players
Austin Aztex players
Íþróttabandalag Vestmannaeyja players
Fylkir players
Ottawa Fury FC players
Grindavík men's football players
Chattanooga Red Wolves SC players
USL League Two players
USL Championship players
USL League One players
Úrvalsdeild karla (football) players
1. deild karla players
American expatriate soccer players
Expatriate footballers in Iceland
Expatriate soccer players in Canada